Axis of Evil is a 2004 France-Canada co-production by Pascal Lièvre about a couple declaring their love for each other with the same words United States President George W. Bush used to announce a war on terrorism.

The short is held in the collections of the Cinémathèque québécoise.

Release 
Axis of Evil premiered on 20 September 2004 at  the Athens Film Festival. It also screened at the 2004 Oberhausen Short Film Festival and was included in a DVD collection of films shown at the event later that same year. The film has since screened at several other film festivals such as the 2007 MIT Short Film Festival and the 2012 Les Rencontres Internationales du Film Documentaire de Fès.

Reception 
Reception for the short has been positive. Andrea Toal covered the short for Sight & Sound, noting that it was "hilarious". The short was also praised by Cornelia Fleer of Film - Dienst and Boris Trbic of Metro Magazine, the latter of whom noted that it received a positive audience reception at the St Kilda Film Festival.

See also 
Baghdad or Bust
Control Room
Kill the Messenger
My Country, My Country
War Feels Like War

References

External links

2004 films
2000s French-language films
French political films
War on terror
Canadian political films
French-language Canadian films
2000s Canadian films
2000s French films